Turtle Island Foods is an American company founded in 1980 in Forest Grove, Oregon and headquartered in Hood River, which produces Tofurky, a popular vegetarian and vegan alternative to turkey, as well other meatless products. All of the company's products are vegan, and most are kosher-certified by the Kosher Services of America. Turtle Island Foods is also the first company in the United States to have their products approved by The Vegan Society in the United Kingdom.

History
Headquartered in Hood River, Oregon, Turtle Island Foods began in 1980 in Forest Grove with intentions "to create delicious, nutritious, convenient and affordable vegetarian food." It was founded by Seth Tibbott, who began by producing tempeh for friends and family. Tibbot was inspired to create meat substitutes after having become a vegetarian in college.

The company name is derived from a common legend found amongst the native people of North America. Once, when all of earth was underwater, a turtle offered its shell as a home for land animals, and that shell became North America.  As a result, several Native American and First Nations refer to the continent as "Turtle Island."

With the help of family, Tibbot eventually expanded his company to what is now the second largest tempeh producer in the United States. Turtle Island Foods has no parent company. The famous Tofurky was only developed in 1995, and initially sold in local markets in Portland, Oregon. According to Tibbot, the first twenty years of the company had not been economically fruitful, and he built tree houses on a neighbor's property in Husum, Washington, which he rented out to tenants for additional income. During the Thanksgiving season of 1995, the company sold a total of 500 of their Tofurky roasts.

In the early 2000s, the company began to grow considerably, shipping a record-breaking 201,108 of their Tofurky roasts in 2006, a 27% increase from the year prior. In 2008, Turtle Island became a sponsor of The Humane Society, the first food processor to do so in the society's history.

In 2011, the company announced plans to build a new plant in Hood River at a cost of $10 million with a goal to achieve a LEED platinum certification on the building. The new  plant opened in October 2012.

Ecological responsibility
Since 1995, when Turtle Island Foods took an official stand against GMOs, they have made "every effort possible" to avoid them. Much of what the company produces is organic, and Turtle Island Foods is actually an "Organic Processor", certified as Oregon Tilth Certified Organic. According to the Cornucopia Institute, Turtle Island uses tofu sourced from 100% organically farmed soybeans, and all manufacturing of products is done in the company's facility. The Green Stars Project awarded Tofurky 5/5 green stars for overall social and environmental impact.

The company refuses food ingredients made with hexane solvent extraction, choosing instead expeller pressed isolates and concentrates.

In 2005, Turtle Island Foods began to purchase all of its electricity from the Blue Sky renewable energy project of the northwestern United States.  All paperboard packaging is recycled. In addition, a certain percentage of each year's Tofurky sales is donated to an environmental charity.

Products
Turtle Island Foods currently produces the following, many in a number of varieties:

In popular culture
In November 2014, Seattle mayor Ed Murray pardoned a Tofurky at Seattle City Hall.

See also

 List of meat substitutes
 List of vegetarian and vegan companies
 List of companies based in Oregon

References

Works cited

External links
Company 

Privately held companies based in Oregon
Meat substitutes
Companies established in 1980
Companies based in Hood River, Oregon
1980 establishments in Oregon
Vegetarian companies and establishments of the United States